Carter Manasco (January 3, 1902 – February 5, 1992) was a U.S. Representative from Alabama.

Born in Townley, Alabama, Manasco attended the public schools and Howard College, Birmingham, Alabama.  He graduated from the University of Alabama School of Law, LL.B., 1927 and J.D. 1929.  He was admitted to the bar the same year and began practice in Jasper, Alabama.  He served as member of the Alabama House of Representatives from 1930 to 1934.  He served as secretary to Speaker William B. Bankhead, 1933-1940.

Manasco was elected as a Democrat to the Seventy-seventh Congress to fill the vacancy caused by the resignation of Walter W. Bankhead.
He was reelected to the Seventy-eighth, Seventy-ninth, and Eightieth Congresses and served from June 24, 1941, to January 3, 1949.  He served as chairman of the Committee on Expenditures in Executive Departments (Seventy-eighth and Seventy-ninth Congresses).

During the early part of the Second World War, he railed against the measures of agencies like the Office of Price Administration:

He was an unsuccessful candidate for renomination in 1948.

He resumed the practice of law and engaged in public relations work.  He served as member of the first Hoover Commission on Reorganization of the Executive Departments from 1947 to 1949.  He was legislative counsel, National Coal Association from 1949 to 1985.

He was a resident of McLean, Virginia, until his death in Arlington, Virginia, on February 5, 1992.

See also

References

External links

1902 births
1992 deaths
People from Walker County, Alabama
Samford University alumni
University of Alabama alumni
Alabama lawyers
Democratic Party members of the United States House of Representatives from Alabama
20th-century American lawyers
20th-century American politicians